Brian T. Roper (19 August 1929 – 14 May 1994) was a British-American film and television actor, and, in later years, real estate agent.

Biography
Roper played youthful parts during his career due to his young physique, which included his appearance as the animal-loving young boy "Dickon" with a pet fox in The Secret Garden (1949), starring Margaret O'Brien. The Secret Garden was prepared for MGM's 25th anniversary as a film studio and was heavily promoted in 1949–50. Newspapers at the time claimed his age as 14. He appeared this age but was actually five years older. Roper was noted for his reddish hair and some freckles.

Born in Doncaster, West Riding of Yorkshire, Roper left Britain on 5 October 1948 when he was 19 years old after his selection for The Secret Garden from more than 100 boys who were tested during a six-month search. Work on the film began on 4 October 1948 and was completed in late November. He later lived in both Britain and California, depending on the location of his acting work, and acted for 24 years.

Following his acting career he went briefly into the film industry agency business. Roper married Barbara L. Eaton (aka Barbara L. Stafsudd), in Los Angeles when he was 38 years old, on 30 December 1967. His wife was 13 years younger. Shortly after this marriage, Roper established the Roper School of Real Estate in 1968 in Hayward, California and served as its lecturer and instructor. He would go on to train new salespeople while serving as director of sales training for Red Carpet Realtors in Northern California.

Death
Brian Roper died in Antibes, France at the age of 64.

Theatrical performances

Filmography
{| class="wikitable" style="font-size: 90%;"
|-
! colspan="4" style="background: LightSteelBlue;"| Film
|-
! Year
! Film
! Role
! Notes
|-
|1947
|Just William's Luck
|Ginger
|
|-
|1948
|William Comes to Town
|Ginger
|U.S. title: William at the Circus.
|-
|1948
|The Boy with Green Hair
|Background boy.
|Uncredited.
|-
|1949
|The Secret Garden
|Dickon
|
|-
|1950
|The Miniver Story
|Richard
|Uncredited.
|-
|1950
|Maria Chapdelaine
|Tit-Be Chapdelaine
|French title: Maria Chapdelaine; U.S. title: The Naked Heart.
|-
|1952
|Time Gentlemen, Please!
|Cyril
|Aka Nothing to Lose.
|-
|1953
|The Girl on the Pier
|Ronnie Hall
|
|-
|1954
|The Rainbow Jacket
|Ron Saunders
|
|-
|1955
|The Blue Peter
|Tony Mullins
|U.S. title:  Navy Heroes (1957).
|-
|1958
|Hong Kong Confidential
|Dennis Brooks
|Spy film.
|-
|1960
|The Lost World
|Zoological Institute [British] – forum participant
|Uncredited.
|-
|-
|-
! colspan="4" style="background: LightSteelBlue;"| Television
|-
! Year
! Title
! Role
! Notes
|-
|1951
|Kaleidoscope
|Boy page
|TV serial of 6 episodes that aired 1951–1952. Roper appeared in 1 episode:
 Episode 2 – "Fools Rush In", 18 May 1951 (first air date).
|-
|1952
|The Secret Garden (TV series 1952)|Dickon
|TV serial of 8 episodes using the Alice de Grey adaptation of Frances Hodgson Burnett's novel (weekly on Tuesdays – first air dates: 29 April 1952 to 17 June 1952). Roper appeared in 4 episodes:
 Episode 4 – "The Door in the Wall", 20 May 1952.
 Episode 6 – "A Tantrum in the Night", 3 June 1952.
 Episode 7 – "It Has Come", 10 June 1952.
 Episode 8 – "When The Sun Went Down", 17 June 1952.
|-
|1956
|ITV Television Playhouse|Gormy Evans
|TV serial that aired for 9 seasons, 1955–64. Roper appeared in 1 episode:
 Season 1, Episode 35 – "Boys in Brown", 24 May 1956 (first air date).
|-
|1955–1956
|Billy Bunter of Greyfriars School|Bob Cherry
|TV serial that aired for 7 seasons, 1952–61. Based on character Billy Bunter at Greyfriars School. Roper appeared in 8 episodes:
 Season 2, Episode 1 – "Bunter on the Run", 9 July 1955 (first air date).
 Season 2, Episode 2 – "Bunter the Hypnotist", 23 July 1955.
 Season 2, Episode 3 – "Lord Billy Bunter", 6 August 1955.
 Season 2, Episode 4 – "Bunter Forgot", 20 August 1955.
 Season 2, Episode 5 – "Bunter Takes the Blame", 3 September 1955.
 Season 2, Episode 6 – "Bunter Knows How", 17 September 1955.
 Season 3, Episode 1 – "Backing Up Bunter", 9 September 1956.
 Season 3, Episode 2 – "Bunter the Bold", 16 September 1956.
|-
|1957
|The Adventures of Sir Lancelot|Alan (4th year squire to King Rolf's son Prince Damien)
|TV serial of 30 episodes that aired for 1 season, 1956–57. Roper appeared at the beginning of 1 episode:
 Season 1, Episode 18 – "Witches' Brew", 19 January 1957 (first air date).
|-
|1958
|Studio 57|
|TV serial that aired for 4 seasons, 1954–1958. U.S. title: Heinz Studio 57. [See Heinz 57]. Roper appeared in 1 episode:
 Season 4, Episode 12 – "A Source of Irritation", 19 January 1958 (first air date).
|-
|1960
|Adventures in Paradise|Potter
|TV serial that aired for 3 seasons, 1959–62. Roper appeared in 1 episode:
 Season 2, Episode 7 – "Hangman's Island", 21 November 1960 (first air date).
|-
|}

Awards and nominations

Affiliations

Notes

References (citations)

References (books)

External links
 
  – 1949 film.
 .

1929 births
1994 deaths
20th-century American male actors
20th-century English male actors
Actors from Doncaster
American male film actors
American male television actors
American male child actors
English male child actors
English male film actors
English male television actors
English expatriates in the United States